Sau may be:

Samberigi language, spoken in Papua New Guinea
Sahu language, spoken in Halmahera, Indonesia

See also 
 Sawi language (Dardic), spoken in the village of Sau, Afghanistan